Mooreia alkaloidigena is a species of bacteria.

References

Cytophagia
Bacteria genera